Mattsson is a Swedish surname.

Geographical distribution
As of 2014, 79.7% of all known bearers of the surname Mattsson were residents of Sweden (frequency 1:541), 12.0% of Finland (1:2,009), 2.3% of the United States (1:672,721), 1.9% of Denmark (1:12,887) and 1.2% of Norway (1:18,235).

In Sweden, the frequency of the surname was higher than national average (1:541) in the following counties:
 1. Blekinge County (1:181)
 2. Uppsala County (1:244)
 3. Jämtland County (1:268)
 4. Dalarna County (1:382)
 5. Västernorrland County (1:401)
 6. Gävleborg County (1:422)
 7. Gotland County (1:464)
 8. Värmland County (1:466)
 9. Västerbotten County (1:468)
 10. Västra Götaland County (1:506)

In Finland, the frequency of the surname was higher than national average (1:2,009) in the following regions:
 1. Åland (1:41)
 2. Southwest Finland (1:937)
 3. Ostrobothnia (1:988)
 4. Central Ostrobothnia (1:1,520)
 5. Uusimaa (1:1,910)

People
André Mattsson, Swedish ice hockey player
Arne Mattsson, Swedish film director
Frank Mattsson, Finnish composer Oskar Merikanto
Helena Mattsson, a Swedish actress
Lars Eric Mattsson, Finnish musician
Magnus Mattsson, Danish footballer
Markus Mattsson, Finnish ice hockey player
Stein-Erik Mattsson (born 1959), Norwegian lawyer, journalist, and comedian

See also
Matson
Mattson

References

Swedish-language surnames
Patronymic surnames
Surnames from given names